A. Annapura  is a village in the southern state of Karnataka, India. It is located in the Shikarpur taluk of Shimoga district in Karnataka.

See also
 Shimoga
 Districts of Karnataka

References

External links
  A. Annapura as per Government Website

Villages in Shimoga district